Arthur Eugène Langerman false Swarzberg, known as Arthur Langerman, born   in Borgerhout in Belgium, is a Belgian diamantaire. He is known for having gathered of one of the largest private collections of anti-Semitic images in the world. The collection constitutes the Arthur Langerman Archives for the Study of Visual Antisemitism (ALAVA) at the Technical University of Berlin in Germany.

Biography 

His father Salomon Langerman false Swarzberg was a furrier born in Krakow in 1907. His Mother Zysla Brandla Blajwas was a milliner born in Warsaw. Both of them settled in Belgium in 1926, and married each other in 1941.  They were arrested on March 28, 1944, and detained at the Mechelen transit camp in Mechelen, then deported to Auschwitz-Birkenau by Transport XXV on May 19, 1944.

Arthur was saved from deportation by being placed at the nursery of the AJB (Association des Juifs de Belgique) in Uccle, and then transferred to the nursery of the Baron de Castro street in Etterbeek. The AJB network of institutions for children was controlled by the Gestapo. The children were saved from a roundup organized a few days before the Liberation of Belgium.
The Nazis sent Zysla to the Auschwitz concentration camp, where she was made to work at the kitchens, which helped her survive. She returned in 1945. Her husband would never come back and had probably died in the spring of the same year in the subcamp of Flossenbürg at Plattling.
The Nazis had murdered at least 18 close relatives of Arthur Langerman.

Upon returning from the camps, her mother was incapable of caring for her young son, Arthur. He stayed for a few months with a couple in Charleroi, who had also cared for one of his cousins, and who have since been recognized as Righteous Among the Nations.
From 1946, Arthur Langerman lived again with his mother. For the rest of her life, she almost never mentioned memories of the Shoah, which was nevertheless always present in the Langerman house: "Grief for the loss of murdered family members was omnipresent".

From age 9 to 17, Arthur attended Hashomer Hatzair, a left wing Zionist Jewish youth organization.

Arthur Langerman has two children. His son Stefan Langerman, mathematician and computer scientist, is research director for the Belgian research foundation F.R.S.-FNRS, specialized in Algorithms.

Diamantaire 
After his high school studies were interrupted in order to support his family, Arthur began training as a diamond cleaver in Antwerp. He then worked for eight years as an employee of a manufacturer who taught him all the facets of the trade, before setting up his own business. In the 1980s he specialized in cutting natural color diamonds.

His business expanded considerably after he sold half of his stock to a jeweller in London; he then became an international reference in the field of colored diamonds. He was regularly interviewed by the international press as an expert in the field and is one of the main protagonists in the documentary film Les Diamants de Couleur de Bornéo by Patrick Voillot (2009). His entire career was based in Antwerp.

Antisemitic documents  
In 1961, the Eichmann trial in Jerusalem is heavily covered by the media. Arthur Langerman as a young adult understands the horror and the scale of the Shoah and ponders the causes of antisemitic hatred. Starting from then, he gathered one of the most important private collections of antisimetica composed of paintings and ancient engravings  (XVIIth -XXth centuries), statuettes (wood, ceramics, bronze), posters, original drawings, postcards and more.

Today, his collection is composed of over 7000 pieces and international antisemitic images catalogued in a computer database.
It contains, among others, hundreds of original drawings of the caricaturist Fips (Philipp Rupprecht), who was the emblematic illustrator of the nazi journal Der Stürmer, which were the object of a study by Ralph Keysers.

Some of these documents were shown at the Dossin Barracks in Mechelen in 2016.
The collection was then the object of an important exhibition "Dessins assassins" at the Mémorial de Caen in 2017-2018.

In 2017, historian and former curator of the Jewish Museum of Belgium, started the inventory of the collection.  , developed a custom database and contributed to the first index of the collection. In the same year, the Center for Research on Antisemitism
of the Technical University of Berlin decided to commit important funds to study Arthur Langerman's collection.

Arthur Langerman and his collection are the subject of a documentary film "Le Collectionneur", directed by Pierre Maillard.

In March 2019, Arthur Langerman donates his collection to the Center for Research on Antisemitism
of the Technical University of Berlin.
A foundation is created, the Arthur Langerman Foundation which holds the Arthur Langerman Archives for the Study of Visual Antisemitism (Arthur Langerman Archiv für die Erforschung des visuellen Antisemitismus : ALAVA).

Langerman's collecting efforts were guided by his attempts to understand the history and geography of antisemitism "Most people, among them my parents, did not take measure of what was happening. Jews were being killed since 1933, but they thought nothing would happen to them, and they even had a child during the war. If they had seen all these images I have in front of me, they would have understood. Maybe they would have fled."

In March 2020, Arthur Langerman is awarded the prize "Mensch of the year 2020" by the Belgian magazine Regards, for his relentless work against antisemitism. For him, "The most antisemitic people have never met jewish people".

Translation 
Since the Shoah, the number of Yiddish speakers had dwindled across the world.

Morpion solitaire
As a player of the classic pen and paper game Morpion solitaire or Join Five, Arthur Langerman holds the highest score obtained by a human in the 5D version. He is also co-author of a scientific article about that game.

References 

Belgian jewellers
Antisemitism
1942 births
Living people